The Good Mothers is a 2023 British-Italian crime drama streaming television series directed by Julian Jarrold and Elisa Amoruso. Adapted from the eponymous novel by Alex Perry, which is based on true events, the series depicts how the three courageous women inside the notorious Calabrian 'Ndrangheta mafia worked with newly minted female prosecutor, to bring down the criminal empire.

It had its international premiere at 73rd Berlin International Film Festival in Berlinale Series on 21 February 2023, as first 2 episodes out of 6 were screened. It won the Berlinale Series Award in the festival, the first time by any series. The Good Mothers will be available for streaming on 5 April 2023 internationally on Disney+ and on Hulu in the United States.

Synopsis
Series set in 2010, begins with the disappearance of Lea Garofalo, who, together with her daughter Denise, had decided to end the 'Ndrangheta mafia. In Calabria, Anna Colace, a public prosecutor committed against the criminal clans, develops a new strategy to crush the power of the gangs by influencing the female members to collaborate and thus undermine the organization's power structure. A strategy that puts women in front, and betray their families, in the hope of better future for themselves and their children.

Cast
 Gaia Girace as Denise Cosco
 Valentina Bellè as Giuseppina Pesce
 Barbara Chichiarelli as Anna Colace
 Francesco Colella as Carlo Cosco
 Simona Distefano as Concetta Cacciola
 Andrea Dodero as Carmine
 Micaela Ramazzotti as Lea Garofalo

Production
On 15 April 2021, Disney+ confirmed the production of its 'Star Original' series The Good Mothers. This Italian mafia series was part of Disney+ and Star's first European originals productions.

Release
The first 2 episodes of the series were screened at 73rd Berlin International Film Festival in Berlinale Series on 21 February 2023. It will be available for streaming on 5 April 2023 internationally on Disney+ and on Hulu in the United States.

Reception
Marco Minniti of Asbury Movies reviewing the 2 episodes of the series stated that it was "unpleasant exercise" to review part of the series. Minniti praised the screenplay, editing and performances. He concluded, "For a more complete evaluation, there is a month and a half to wait, but the premises, at the moment, seem more than good."

Awards and nominations

References

External links
 
 The Good Mothers at Berlinale
 The Good Mothers at Cineuropa

2023 Italian television series debuts
Italian-language television shows
Star (Disney+) original programming
Television shows set in Italy
Television series based on books
Television series based on actual events
Italian crime television series
Italian drama television series
2020s Italian drama television series
Television series about organized crime
Works about organized crime in Italy
2020s British drama television series
Television series set in 2010